"The Thunder, Perfect Mind" is a text originally discovered among the Gnostic manuscripts in the Nag Hammadi library in 1945. It follows a poetic structure, and has received scholarly attention for its gnomic style and unclear subject. It speaks about the divine in paradoxical terms, as both honored and cursed, as life and death, and as both the cause of peace and war. The poem also emphasizes the idea that the divine exists both inside and outside of oneself, and that one's judgment and salvation are dependent on their relationship to the divine. It offers a unique perspective on the nature of the divine and the individual's relationship to it, and it highlights the idea of duality and the interconnectedness of opposing forces.

Some authors, such as George MacRae and Hal Taussig, contend against categorizing "The Thunder" as Gnostic literature.

Summary
The opening text announces the seemingly feminine speaker's power and presence. The speaker, who was sent forth from a power, has come to those who reflect upon them and has been found among those seeking after them. The speaker invites those waiting for them to take them in, but warns not to ignore or banish them. The speaker presents themselves as a complex figure, embodying seemingly contradictory qualities such as the first and the last, the honored and the scorned, and the bride and the bridegroom.

The speaker warns to not be arrogant or dismissive of their poverty and shame but also to not be afraid of their power. The speaker questions why they are hated for their obedience and feared for their power and asserts that they exist in all fears and have strength in trembling. They describe themselves as compassionate and cruel, senseless and wise. The speaker urges to be cautious and not to dismiss their fear or curse their pride.

The text continues describing opposite qualities, such as that the speaker is both loved and hated by all people. They are seen as wisdom by the Greeks and knowledge by the barbarians, life and death, law and lawlessness. The speaker is also described as Godless and unlearned but with great power, and those who know the speaker are encouraged to come forward to them and not despise smallness or turn away greatness from small things. It calls to come forward to childhood.

The speaker continues to mention paradoxical traits, such as being both honored and despised, both close and far away, both sinless and the root of sin. They are both the knowledge of their inquiry and the finding of those who seek them, the command of those who ask of them, and the power of powers. The speaker claims to be the one who is called Truth, yet they are also associated with iniquity. They describe themselves as a mute who speaks, a bread maker, and the knowledge of their own name. The speaker encourages listeners to hear them with gentleness and learn from them through roughness. They describe themselves as a crier who also listens, and who walks in the seal of their mind. The speaker is described as the defense and says that they are called Truth.

The conclusion sees the speaker describe themselves as the hearing attainable to all, the sound of a name, and the one who alone exists and has no one to judge them. They encourage the hearers to look at the speaker's words and writings, and to heed the message and find the speaker in their resting place, where they will live without dying again.

Form

The content of "The Thunder, Perfect Mind" (the title may alternately be translated "The Thunder, Perfect Intellect") takes the form of an extended, riddling monologue, in which an immanent divine saviour speaks a series of paradoxical statements alternating between first-person assertions of identity and direct address to the audience. These paradoxical utterances echo Greek identity riddles, a common early poetic form in the Mediterranean. Moreover, it is a non-epistolic, non-narrative unmediated divine speech.

It has been theorized that the text was originally composed in Greek due to its meter and phrasing, and it has been dated to a vaguely estimated period of time before 350 C.E., the date of the Coptic manuscript from which the text originates.

Structure and language
The work as a whole takes the form of a poem in parallel strophes, and the author, it may be surmised, has drawn on a tradition of such poems in both Egyptian and Jewish communities, in which a similarly female divinity (Isis or aspect of the divine Sophia respectively) expounds her virtues unto an attentive audience, and exhorts them to strive to attain her. Patricia Cox Miller suggests that it is the "self-revelation of a powerful goddess".

Parallels in Mandaic scriptures
In Book 6 (also known as the "Book of Dinanukt") of the Right Ginza, Ruha addresses a speech to Dinanukht, which is similar to "The Thunder, Perfect Mind" (see the poem in the Dinanukht article).

References

2nd-century texts
3rd-century texts
Texts in Coptic
Nag Hammadi library